The 1998 United States Senate election in Kentucky was held November 3, 1998. It was concurrent with elections to the United States House of Representatives. Incumbent Democratic U.S. Senator Wendell Ford decided to retire, instead of seeking a fifth term. Republican U.S. Representative Jim Bunning narrowly won the open seat, defeating Democratic U.S. Representative Scotty Baesler. This was the first open Senate seat since 1972. By a margin of 0.59%, this election was the second-closest race of the 1998 Senate election cycle, behind only the election in Nevada.

Democratic primary

Candidates 
 Scotty Baesler, U.S. Representative
 Jim Brown
 Steve Henry, Lieutenant Governor
 Charlie Owen, businessman
 Ken Buchanan Thompson
 David L. Williams, member of the Kentucky Senate

Results

Republican primary

Candidates 
 Jim Bunning, U.S. Representative
 Barry Metcalf, State Senator

Results

General election

Candidates 
 Scotty Baesler (D), U.S. Representative
 Jim Bunning (R), U.S. Representative

Results

See also 
 1998 United States Senate elections

References 

United States Senate
Kentucky
1998